Tim Cowen (born August 18, 1958) is an American professional stock car racing driver. He last competed part-time in the NASCAR Xfinity Series, driving the No. 66 Ford Mustang for MBM Motorsports.

Early life
Cowen was born in Loudonville, Ohio and grew up in Perrysville. Sports were prominent in his life and he was initially interested in football before switching to racing.

Racing career

NASCAR Xfinity Series

Cowen began racing in the Xfinity Series in 2014 at Mid-Ohio, where he drove the No. 86 Ford. He started 30th and finished 18th.

In 2015, Cowen drove the No. 13 Ford in the Mid-Ohio and Road America races. He finished 30th at Ohio and 25th at Road America.

In 2016, Cowen ran the Mid-Ohio race in the No. 13 Ford, but a crash took him out of the race, leading to a 37th-place finish.

In 2017, Cowen would again run the Mid-Ohio and Road America races. At Mid-Ohio, he drove the No. 40 Ford and finished 20th. At Road America, he drove the No. 40 Dodge and finished 36th due to a crash.

In 2018, Cowen drove the No. 66 Ford Mustang for MBM Motorsports and finished 26th at Mid-Ohio.

NASCAR Craftsman Truck Series
Cowen made his Truck Series debut in 2007, driving the No. 42 Ford F-150 for his own team, Cowen Racing. He planned to run the two races at Martinsville and the Mansfield race, but only successfully qualified for and ran the latter.

Cowen returned to the Truck Series in 2008, running three races (Martinsville, Mansfield, and Memphis) for his team.

Motorsports career results

NASCAR
(key) (Bold – Pole position awarded by qualifying time. Italics – Pole position earned by points standings or practice time. * – Most laps led.)

Xfinity Series

Craftsman Truck Series

Camping World East Series

ARCA Racing Series
(key) (Bold – Pole position awarded by qualifying time. Italics – Pole position earned by points standings or practice time. * – Most laps led.)

 Season still in progress
 Ineligible for series points

References

External links

 

Living people
1958 births
NASCAR drivers
Racing drivers from Ohio
People from Loudonville, Ohio
ARCA Menards Series drivers